Montecassiano is a comune (municipality) in the Province of Macerata in the Italian region Marche, located about  south of Ancona and about  north of Macerata.

The municipality of Montecassiano contains the frazioni (subdivisions, mainly villages and hamlets) Sant'Egidio, Sambucheto, Vallecascia, and Vissani.

Montecassiano borders the following municipalities: Appignano, Macerata, Montefano, Recanati.

Main sights
Sights in the town include: 
Palazzo dei Priori (13th century)
  Church of San Marco (14th century)
 Collegiate church of Santa Maria della Misericordia (12th century) 
 Collegiate church  Santa Maria Assunta 
  Oratory of San Nicolò (13th century)

References

External links
 Official website

Cities and towns in the Marche